Since declaring independence in 1981, Belize has enacted many environmental protection laws aimed at the preservation of the country's natural and cultural heritage, as well as its wealth of natural resources. These acts have established a number of different types of protected areas, with each category having its own set of regulations dictating public access, resource extraction, land use and ownership.

Roughly 26% (2.6 million acres, or 1.22 million hectares) of Belizean land and sea is preserved within a total of 95 reserves, which vary in their purpose and level of protection. This network of protected areas exists under a variety of management structures:
  of terrestrial reserves;
  of marine reserves;
  protected through officially recognised private conservation initiatives.
However, most of these protected areas are actually for the management of resource use and extraction, rather than for the preservation of the environment.

Background

Biodiversity 
Situated within the Mesoamerican hotspot, Belize has a high level of terrestrial and aquatic biodiversity. It is home to more than 150 species of mammals, 540 of birds, 150 of amphibians and reptiles, nearly 600 species of freshwater and marine fish and 3,408 species of vascular plants. The country contains a vast array of ecosystems, many of which are critical habitats for threatened and endangered species.

The Mesoamerican Barrier Reef System, stretching the full length of the country's coastline, is the largest unbroken coral reef complex in the Western Hemisphere. In Belize, the reef's rich diversity of corals and other marine life has qualified it to be designated a World Heritage Site, in recognition of its consequent global importance.

Much of the mainland of Belize forms part of the Mesoamerican Biological Corridor, which comprises a network of protected areas linked by biological corridors, stretching from Mexico to Panamá. Belize has two large, unified, blocks of intact virgin rainforest that are likely to be the last strongholds for species that require large, undisturbed areas for their long-term survival, such as the jaguar.

The number of species endemic to Belize is low, since Belize is a small country and does not have many habitats that are unique. Most of the few endemics are found in the Maya Mountains and in the lowland savannas of Belize.

History 

Up until the 1970s, Belize, formerly British Honduras, had relatively relaxed environmental laws that went largely unenforced. However, with the formation of the Belize Audubon Society in 1969, public awareness of the value of conservation grew rapidly. After gaining independence in 1981, the government passed both the National Park System Act and the Wildlife Protection Act, designating an array of protected areas of different status, and providing a codification for the protection of the immense biodiversity of life contained in the parks.

Since then, governmental departments such as the Department of the Environment and the Forests Department, both under the Ministry of Natural Resources and the Environment, were established to research and regulate the issues and laws concerning the country's protected areas. Soon following was the Environmental Protection Act of 1992, which outlined the statutory powers of the Department of the Environment.

To ensure proper financial backing, the Protected Areas Conservation Trust (PACT) was created in 1996. This trust is responsible for all funds raising, and the allocation of funds to protected areas.

Belize is party to a number of legally binding multilateral environmental agreements, many of which deal with proper management of the country's natural resources. These include, most notably, the Convention on International Trade in Endangered Species (CITES), Convention Concerning the Protection of the World Cultural and Natural Heritage, Convention on Biological Diversity (CBD), Convention to Combat Desertification (CCD), Framework Convention on Climate Change (FCCC). Since its ratification of the Ramsar Convention in 1998, Belize has had two sites designated as wetlands of international importance: Crooked Tree Wildlife Sanctuary, in 1998, and Sarstoon-Temash National Park, in 2005.

Recent analysis 
In October 2003, the Ministry of Natural Resources and the Environment began developing a comprehensive "National Protected Areas Policy & System Plan", which focuses on establishing a balance between environmental conservation and the need for economic development, as well as on rationalising the allocation of financial funding and human resources across the protected areas system.

An evaluation compiled in 2005 identified a number of flaws in the system. These included a lack of government co-ordination with private landowners, and an overall insufficience of data for reference, planning and management. It criticised the unnecessarily large number of management units, many of which overlap considerably and incongruously, and suggested that it would be more efficient to create a single agency responsible for all areas of natural resource management.

The analysis also noted the need for stricter conservation methods in forest reserves, and to encourage sustainable methods of resource extraction. It stressed the need to further protect and maintain biological corridors in their entirety, which would require the co-operation and participation of private landowners. Another ecotype identified as lacking proper attention was the country's deep water ecosystems, which had received neither formal protection nor any research into whether they should be.

As part of an attempt to prioritise resource allocation (both human and financial) across the system, the protected areas were ranked on their ecological, socio-cultural and economic value. The following areas were ranked as the most ecologically important in the country:
Río Bravo Conservation and Management Area
Aguacaliente Wildlife Sanctuary
Bacalar Chico Marine Reserve
Glover's Reef Marine Reserve
Crooked Tree Wildlife Sanctuary
Shipstern Conservation & Management Area
Community Baboon Sanctuary
It is important to note that many of the top-scoring reserves, including Río Bravo, are privately owned. It was recommended that this scoring system be used to monitor the performance of protected areas in the future. The full analysis of the system was published in November 2005.

Protected areas

Types 

Archaeological Reserve: These reserves are designated for the protection of historic archaeological sites, typically ancient Mayan ruins.
Forest Reserve: These areas are designed for sustainable timber extraction without destroying the biodiversity of the location. Companies are given permits to extract after being reviewed by the Forests Department.
Marine Reserve: These are designated for the conservation of aquatic ecosystems, including marine animals and their habitats, as well as for the sustainable extraction of marine resources. These reserves are managed by the Department of Fisheries.
National Park: These parks are areas of recreation and tourism, as well as environmental protection. Visitors are welcome to explore the park.
Natural Monument: This protected area is designated for unique geographic features of the landscape, to preserve them for research projects and future generations.
Nature Reserve: These parks enjoy the highest level of protection; permits are required to enter the area and are restricted to researchers only. Nature reserves are typically pristine, wilderness ecosystems.
Private Reserve: Either official or unofficial, these reserves are owned and operated by private conservation initiatives, and enjoy various levels of protection.
Wildlife Sanctuary: These areas are created for the preservation of an important keystone species in the ecosystem. By preserving enough area for them to live in, many other species receive the protection they need as well.

Management 
Overall oversight of conservation and management of protected areas in Belize is the responsibility of the Ministry of Natural Resources and the Environment. The country's system of private reserves are co-ordinated under the Belize Association of Private Protected Areas.

The Belize Audubon Society (BAS) was founded in 1969, and oversees a total of nine protected areas, including 4 natural monuments, 2 national parks, 2 wildlife sanctuaries and 1 nature reserve.

The Protected Areas Conservation Trust (PACT), founded in 1995, provides funds for the development of conservation and the promotion of environmentally sound management of Belize's natural and cultural resources, in order to foster sustainable development. It is primarily financed by the collection of a conservation levy included in the country's airport departure tax.

Design 
To protect as many different species and ecosystems as possible, methods of conservation biology are used to maximise the biodiversity of each park or reserve.  There are design methods to these parks on both the micro and macro scale.
	
When designing a particular park, care is taken to ensure that the area contains as many different ecosystems as possible, and allows enough space for populations of species to thrive.  An edge effect, or the negative impacts of having developed or destroyed land all the way up to the edge of protected area, can be very detrimental to the organisms living in the preserve.  To compensate for this, parks are planned to have as much of a buffer zone as possible to prevent destructive practices all the way to a parks perimeter.  Well planned protected areas also prevent phenomenon such as habitat fragmentation. For instance, the Bladen Nature Reserve, an area of pristine primary rainforest, is surrounded on all sides by other less regulated protected areas, ensuring that no negative edge effects will ever reach the borders of the reserve.
	
On the larger scale, parks are designed together to create corridors, or areas of passage for migratory or wide-ranging species.  A great example of this is the planned Mesoamerican Biological Corridor, which, when completed, will allow for the migration of animals from Mexico through Central America and down into South America.

Critical species 
As part of the process to assess the conservation status and the risk of local extinction of native species, the Ministry of Natural Resources and the Environment maintains a "National List of Critical Species", including both terrestrial and marine species, prepared under the IUCN guidelines for regional red lists. While the list uses IUCN terminology, it does not claim to have followed the IUCN Red List methodology to the full extent.

Under the system applied in the IUCN Red List database, species are classified in nine categories, set through criteria such as rate of decline, population size, area of geographic distribution, and degree of population and distribution fragmentation.
Summary of 2006 IUCN Red List categories
Critically Endangered (CR) — extremely high risk of extinction in the wild.
Endangered (EN) — High risk of extinction in the wild.
Vulnerable (VU) — High risk of endangerment in the wild.
Near Threatened (NT) — Likely to become endangered in the near future.
Least Concern (LC) — Lowest risk; does not qualify for a more at-risk category. Widespread and abundant taxa are included in this category.
Data Deficient (DD) — Not enough data to make an assessment of its risk of extinction.
Not Evaluated (NE) — Has not yet been evaluated against the criteria.

Justification 
 The present trends in the global populations of all groupers are decreasing. Measures have been taken to protect spawning sites of these fish in Belize, and the government is attempting to introduce measures that will allow it to sustainably manage this resource. For this reason, all grouper species have been placed in the CD (Conservation dependent) category.
 Endemic species
 Small range (regionally endemic)
 Hunted or fished
 Economic importance
 Colony breeder (restricted number of breeding colonies/locations)
 Needs large range
 Specialised ecological requirements
 Charismatic species drawing national and international attention
 Prosecuted as perceived pest
 Genetically different from South American counterpart

Amphibians
Because amphibians are especially sensitive to environmental contamination, they are considered excellent indicators of the health of an ecosystem. Neotropic forests host the world's greatest diversity of anuran species. In Belize, amphibian populations remain largely undetermined due to their isolation and probable scarcity, and subsequently only fragmentary information is available on their status and distribution.

From the mid-19th century, various scientific explorers such as Godman, Morelet and Salvin conducted herpetological research from samples collected in Belize and the surrounding Petén Basin. It was not until 1941, however, that herpetologist Karl P. Schmidt made the first attempt to summarise the various species of amphibians in Belize. His studies were summarised in a series of papers by Neill and Allen during the late 1950s and 1960s. Similar reports were later published by R. W. Henderson during the 1970s, C. J. McCoy between 1966 and 1990, and Campbell and Vannini (1989), Meerman (1993), Strafford (1994), and Meyer and Farneti-Foster (1996). These contributed to an increased understanding and an updated checklist of the amphibian species occurring in the country.

Birds
A total of 550 avian species have been recorded in Belize, including four globally threatened species. Although it has no politically endemic birds, the country is important for the protection of some 36 biome-restricted species. Situated at the northern end of the Mesoamerican mainland, Belize is an important flyway for migratory birds. This route, while still relatively healthy, is under constant threat from anthropogenic activities, including urban and coastal development and increasingly fragmented habitats. Other major concerns surrounding avian conservation in Belize are the effects of hunting and poaching on population trends. Recent marked declines in certain species has spurred a growing interest in engaging locals at all levels to monitor avian populations.

The early stages of bird conservation in Belize are attributed to the Belize Audubon Society, whose first conservation project was the jabiru, added to Belize's list of protected species in 1973. In 1977, the government established seven bird sanctuaries for the protection of waterfowl nesting and roosting colonies. In 1984, however, a field study noted that, due to the absence of wardens, all but one of these cayes had been destroyed by hunters and fishermen.

In 2004, BirdLife International, in partnership with the Belize Audubon Society, delineated six Important Bird Areas in the country, each representing an average of 347 species. While these areas are not formally protected areas, their identification serves to create awareness and guide future conservation initiatives aimed at avian biodiversity. The establishment of monitoring activities has been identified as a key priority in ascertaining the health of these areas.

Poaching is a serious concern for local bird conservationists. Because of the large range of many avian species, surveillance of this activity is almost impossible. The scarlet macaw, threatened with extinction in Belize, has one of its last havens in the Chiquibul forests. Poaching remains almost unchecked in this remote region. Stretching along the border with Guatemala, the birds are smuggled and then sold for high prices on international markets. A macaw chick can be sold for approximately 2,400 quetzales (about BZ$700, or US$310), while adults will fetch up to 4000 quetzales (about BZ$1000, or US$520).

From January to July ever year, the Upper Macal becomes an active breeding ground for macaws. According to the Friends for Conservation and Development, charged with maintaining surveillance in the Chiquibul area, the breeding ground is a prime target for smugglers. In 2009, ten macaws, valued at up to BZ$10,000, were reportedly taken from the Upper Macal by a single poaching party, and then sold in Las Flores, Guatemala. In June 2010, the director of the organisation announced that it had upgraded its monitoring program in this area, but were limited by manpower and resources.

April, May and June are the months when illegal activities spike. Other species, such as the endangered curassow have also been illegally hunted.

The status of eagles in Belize was first summarised in a study by Jack C. Eitniear in 1986. Since then, many of the species recorded by Eitniear have declined as a result of shooting, poaching, and habitat and nest destruction.

A number of initiatives now exist for the conservation of eagle species in Belize. Among them is the Belize Harpy Eagle Restoration Program, started in 2003 by Sharon Matola, the director of the Belize Zoo, for the re-establishment of the harpy eagle within Belize. Captive-bred harpy eagles were released in the Rio Bravo forest, chosen for its ecological quality and preserved connection to similarly protected forests in Guatemala and Mexico. As of November 2009, 14 individuals had been released and were being tracked by The Peregrine Fund. At the beginning of 2011, scientists confirmed the presence of harpy eagle nest in the Bladen Nature Reserve, which represented the first confirmed breeding pair in Belize in over 60 years. It was seen as a major comeback for the species and a success for conservation efforts.

Other avian-based conservation initiatives include Belize Bird Rescue, an organisation founded in April 2004 for the rehabilitation of injured and orphaned birds, with a particular focus on parrots.

Jaguar

Jaguars require a large, undisturbed territory with a high density of prey. For this reason, the species is coming increasingly under pressure from the expanding human impact on its environment. In 2005, Jan Meerman, the leading biologist in the government's conservation review committee, wrote:

Meerman's terminology was derived from a 2004 study by the Wildlife Conservation Society (WCS), which identified two remaining "wild areas" in Belize:
the Maya Mountains–Chiquibul–Cockscomb (southern) block (1,290,000 acres/520,000 hectares), which is isolated, and
the Rio Bravo–Gallon Jug–Yalbac (northern) block (470,000 acres/190,000 hectares), which neighbours larger wilderness areas in Guatemala and southern México.
Because of the minimal human presence in these areas, it is probable that they will become the last strongholds of the jaguar within Belize. A state-sponsored analysis in 2005 estimated the population of adult jaguars within these two blocks to be around 400 and 200 respectively. A 2002 study by the National Autonomous University of Mexico concluded that for the long-term survival of jaguar populations, the minimum population should not fall below 650 adult individuals. Based on this, the last two potential strongholds for jaguars in Belize are—independently—insufficient to allow for conservation of the species in the long term. The survival of the population will therefore strongly depend on the preservation of narrow corridors allowing inter-migrations of jaguar populations from other areas, and in the northern block, the continued connection to adjacent populations across the border. The maintenance of a high-density prey base will also be an important factor.

Surveys conducted in 2004 by the WCS calculated the average density of jaguars in three of the country's protected areas:
Cockscomb Basin area (39,290 acres/15,900 hectares): 1 jaguar per 2,806 acres/1136 hectares
Chiquibul area (26,440 acres/10,700 hectares): 1 jaguar per 3,633 acres/1471 hectares
Gallon Jug area (48,185 acres/19,500 hectares): 1 jaguar per 2,186 acres/885 hectares
The first of these, Cockscomb Basin Wildlife Sanctuary, was declared in February 1986 the world's first jaguar preserve. Hunting has been prohibited in the area since 1984. Prior to its recent expansion, the reserve contained the highest density of jaguars ever recorded, and is regarded as one of the most important areas for the conservation of the species.

Manatee

The Antillean manatee, a subspecies of Trichechus manatus, is sparsely distributed throughout the Caribbean. They are threatened by loss of habitat, poaching, entanglement with fishing gear, and increased boating activity. In Belize, manatee distribution principally coincides with 4 protected areas, at least 3 of which were declared specifically for the conservation of this species:
Corozal Bay Wildlife Sanctuary
Swallow Caye Wildlife Sanctuary
Gales Point Wildlife Sanctuary
Port Honduras Marine Reserve
Collectively, these areas cover approximately 55% of the significant manatee distribution within Belize.

Other mammals

Reptiles

Grouper

Belize's maritime territory is home to 13 species of grouper. Surveys conducted by the Green Reef Environmental Institute in 2001 and 2002 concluded that local populations of grouper were in rapid decline, and all species of grouper native to Belize are now considered "conservation dependent".

Highly prized by fishermen, groupers once constituted one of the most commercially valuable exports of Belize. Annual spawning aggregations at specific times and locations have made the species highly vulnerable to over-fishing. Fertile females contain sacks of roe that sell for up to four times more per pound than the actual fish itself, meaning that in many cases individuals will be removed before they have had the chance to reproduce. Belize is one of the few Caribbean countries that still allow for these species to be fished.

Representative of the trend in grouper populations throughout the Caribbean is the endemic and now-endangered Nassau grouper (Epinephelus striatus), once one of the most commonly caught fishes in Belize. About one-third of the spawning aggregations sites for this species have disappeared due to over-fishing. Annual spawning occurs in specific locations on the outer reef shelf during the days around the full moon of December and January. Aggregations can range anywhere from a dozen to up to several thousand adult individuals and are usually in the same site each year, making an easy target for fishermen. This intensive harvesting of reproductively active individuals, often before they have had the chance to spawn, has resulted in a marked decline in both abundance and size. One site for example, Caye Glory, historically provided a catch of up to 1,200–1,800 Nassau groupers per boat per spawning season during the 1960s. In 2001, at the same site, fishers caught just 9 individuals out of an aggregation of 21 groupers. In addition, groupers typically take a long time to reach maturity. Because of this, over the past few years females have continued to decrease in average size, indicating that more mature females are being removed, leaving behind young females with fewer eggs.

A study in September 2002 determined that many of the spawning sites of the Nassau grouper were in fact "multi-species" aggregations with an average of between 6 and 7 species recorded at 16 sites during the January 2002 spawning season.

In November 2002, under pressure from environmental organisations, the government agreed to protect 11 of these sites from commercial fishing during the spawning season. The most significant of these are at Glover's Reef and Sandbore Caye, which have been identified as the only two viable sites remaining for the species, of nine historically known locations. At Glover's Reef, scientists documented an 80% decrease in grouper populations since the 1970s. In 2002, both the sites were declared special marine reserves, permanently closed to fishing. These and five other sites are regularly monitored by a taskforce of the Wildlife Conservation Society. Its report of the 2009 spawning season at Glover's Reef concluded that numbers were still in decline, and that the majority of the individuals recorded were immature and less than the legal minimum landing size.

In addition to the easily discernible ecological effects, there are serious economic impacts on local communities when fish stock are depleted. A study in January 2001 estimated that the value of the largest spawning aggregation sites, if fished, would be realised and exhausted within a decade, since the species would disappear with low chances of recovery. Attempts in the past to close the sites to fishing failed because some denied that the species was in decline, arguing that it simply relocates its aggregations from year to year. Following the Green Reef surveys, however, the closure and monitoring of remaining known aggregation sites was seen as essential to ensure their long-term viability, and subsequently the survival of both the species and the fishing industry that depends on it.

Corals

Vegetation 

Belize is widely regarded by experts as a highly forested country, often cited as having the highest percentage of forest cover in Central America. A study completed in 1996 determined, however, that the country's forest cover has been in decline. The clearing of land for agricultural and urban development has had a quantifiable impact on vegetation cover, as have forest fires. However, in the context of the wider region, Belize's deforestation rates are relatively low, due to a lower population density, a more urbanised population, and a history of protecting its forests.

Forest cover facts:
Total forest area: 
% of land area: 62.7%

Primary forest cover: 
% of land area: 20.9%
% total forest area: 34.0%
Studies conducted by various researchers estimate that between 1989 and 1994, forest covered between 65 and 67% of the country's total area; although one earlier study put the figure at over 74%. Prior to this, the extent of Belize's forests remains largely unknown. In 1959, a map was published estimating Belize's natural vegetation prior to colonial settlement of the territory, which showed forest cover at almost 89%. In 2004, it was approximated at around 62%, meaning that in the ten-year period between 1994 and 2004, the country lost a total of 561,473 hectares of forest cover.

A study conducted in 2010 by SERVIR (Sistema Regional de Visualización y Monitoreo) and CATHALAC (Centro del Agua del Trópico Húmedo para América Latina y El Caribe), retrospectively estimated the country's total forest cover datasets for 1980, 1989, 1994, 2000, 2004 and 2010. It drew on data from previous studies, but used remote sensing, and was recognised by the intergovernmental Group on Earth Observations (GEO), of which Belize is a member. It reported that in mid-November 1980, Belize had around   (75.9%) of forest cover, which declined to   (62.7%) by late February 2010. This concluded that over the thirty-year period,   (17.4%) of the country's total forest area in 1980 had been lost by 2010, representing an average annual deforestation rate of   (0.6%) per year.

The same study found that, throughout the period researched, the Cayo district remained the most forested region both relatively and in plain quantity. It also, however, recorded a greater absolute loss than any other district, while Corozal had the highest relative loss, with almost a third of the forest which had existed there in 1980 being razed by 2010 due to agricultural expansion.

Perhaps the most compelling finding of the study was that, over the thirty-year period studied, only 15% of deforestation occurred in protected areas, while 85% occurred outside.

This estimation of Belize's current stock of forest carbon at over 300 million tons allows the country to fulfil one of the criteria for the REDD initiative (Reducing Emissions from Deforestation and Forest Degradation). Belize is a signatory to a number of multilateral environmental agreements requiring the regular monitoring of national forest cover and overall land use.

Sustainable logging
In 1993, the Forestry Department estimated that Belize had  of land with potential for timber extraction. Of this only  or 14% was within forest reserves. In both studies, slopped areas with a gradient of over 10% were excluded.

The later study also noted that a large percentage of extractable timber reserves were located on private land. Therefore, the presence of a sustainable logging industry in Belize largely depends on landowners keeping forests intact and managing the land for sustainable timber extraction. However, the study noted that under the current Land Tax, there is an enormous disincentive for this.

Endemic flora
Floral species endemic to Belize are few, given the country's small size. One endemic species of cycad known as Zamia prasina is considered endemic to remote areas of the Maya Mountains, in southwest Belize. IUCN assessment reported that populations were trending towards decline, and that less than 100 plants were known, which prompted the Belizean government to take measures for its conservation. Other endemic species include Schippia concolor and Dorstenia belizensis.

See also 
Fauna of Belize
Flora of Belize

References

External links